National Authority for Chemical Weapons Convention or NACWC is an office in Cabinet Secretariat, Government of India, established on 29 April 1997 by a resolution of the Cabinet and was later accorded a statutory status through Chemical Weapons Convention Act, 2000.

References 

Cabinet Secretariat of India
Chemical weapons demilitarization